60P/Tsuchinshan, also known as Tsuchinshan 2, is a periodic comet in the Solar System with an orbital period of 6.79 years. Tsuchinshan is the Wade-Giles transliteration corresponding to the pinyin Zĭjīn Shān, which is Mandarin Chinese for "Purple Mountain".

It was discovered at the Purple Mountain Observatory, Nanking, China on 11 January 1965 with a magnitude estimated as a very faint 15. The elliptical orbit was computed to give a perihelion date of 9 February 1965 with an orbital period of 6.69 years. Revised calculations predicted the next perihelion would be on 28 November 1971 and Elizabeth Roemer of the University of Arizona successfully relocated the comet with the 154-cm reflector at Catalina. It was also observed in 1978, 1985, 1991-1992, and 1998-1999.

The comet peaked at about apparent magnitude 16.3 in 2012. On 29 December 2077 the comet will pass  from Mars.

See also
 List of numbered comets

References

External links 
 Orbital simulation from JPL (Java) / Horizons Ephemeris
 60P/Tsuchinshan 2 – Seiichi Yoshida @ aerith.net
 Elements and Ephemeris for 60P/Tsuchinshan – Minor Planet Center
 60P at Kronk's Cometography
 60P with UGC 6510 (2019-Jan-10)

Periodic comets
0060
19650111